The Antonio Torres House is a historic house in San Lorenzo, Grant County, New Mexico.  It was listed on the National Register of Historic Places in 1988.  The house was built around 1930 by Antonio Torres and his wife, Josefina Ancheta.

The house is deemed to be Vernacular New Mexico in style.  Although the house is built of adobe with corrugated metal roofing, it has a rectangular plan and symmetry reflective of the Classical-derived "Hipped Box" type of architecture, of which it was deemed a "good example".

It was listed on the National Register as part of a 1988 study of historic resources in the Mimbres Valley of Grant County.

References

Houses completed in 1930
Houses on the National Register of Historic Places in New Mexico
National Register of Historic Places in Grant County, New Mexico